A by-election was held for the Australian House of Representatives seat of Corio on 2 March 1940. This was triggered by the resignation of United Australia Party MP Richard Casey to become Australian Ambassador to the United States.

The by-election was won by Labor candidate John Dedman.

Results

References

1940 elections in Australia
Victorian federal by-elections
1940s in Victoria (Australia)